John Prior may refer to:

 John Prior (politician), Irish Cumann na nGaedheal politician
 John D. Prior (1840–1923), British trade unionist 
 John Prior (musician) (born 1960), Australian musician, composer and producer
 John Prior (cricketer) (born 1960), Irish cricketer

See also
 John Pryor (disambiguation)